Dzon Delarge (born 24 June 1990) is a Congolese footballer who plays as a winger.

Career
He started his football career in Union Douala, a club from Cameroon, where has been spotted by the Slovak club DAC Dunajská Streda. He joined this club in July 2011.

He made his debut in Slovak Super Liga for Dunajská Streda against FC Spartak Trnava on 17 July 2011.
Despite his 8 goals in 32 matches, the club was relegated to the Slovak Second League.

In summer 2012, he was transferred to Slovan Liberec, a club in the Czech Gambrinus liga.

On 24 July 2018, Delarge left Bursaspor and signed a three-year contract with Qarabağ FK. On 17 January 2019, Qarabağ announced that Delarge had been sent to train with Qarabağ-2.

Honours
 Slovan Liberec
Czech Cup: 2014–15

References

External links

1990 births
Living people
Republic of the Congo footballers
Republic of the Congo expatriate footballers
Republic of the Congo international footballers
Association football forwards
FC DAC 1904 Dunajská Streda players
FC Slovan Liberec players
FC Admira Wacker Mödling players
Ankaraspor footballers
Bursaspor footballers
Qarabağ FK players
SK Dynamo České Budějovice players
Boluspor footballers
Akhisarspor footballers
Czech First League players
Slovak Super Liga players
Süper Lig players
Azerbaijan Premier League players
TFF First League players
Republic of the Congo expatriate sportspeople in the Czech Republic
Republic of the Congo expatriate sportspeople in Slovakia
Republic of the Congo expatriate sportspeople in Turkey
Republic of the Congo expatriate sportspeople in Azerbaijan
Expatriate footballers in the Czech Republic
Expatriate footballers in Slovakia
Expatriate footballers in Austria
Expatriate footballers in Turkey
Expatriate footballers in Azerbaijan
Sportspeople from Brazzaville